Camden may refer to:

People 
 Camden (surname), a surname of English origin
 Camden Joy (born 1964), American writer
 Camden Toy (born 1957), American actor

Places

Australia 
 Camden, New South Wales
 Camden, Rosehill, a heritage residence, NSW
 Camden Airport (New South Wales)
 Camden Council (New South Wales)
 Electoral district of Camden

Canada 
 Camden, Nova Scotia
 Camden East, Ontario

England 
 London Borough of Camden
 Camden Town, an area in the borough
 Camden markets
 Camden School for Girls

Ireland 
 Camden Fort Meagher in Cork Harbour
 Camden Street, Dublin

United States 
 Camden, Alabama
 Camden, Arkansas
 Camden, California (disambiguation)
 Camden, Fresno County, California
 Camden, Delaware
 Camden, Illinois
 Camden, Indiana
 Camden, Maine, a town
 Camden (CDP), Maine, a census-designated place within the town
 Camden, Michigan
 Camden, Minneapolis, Minnesota, a community comprising several neighborhoods
 Camden, Mississippi
 Camden, Missouri
 Camden, New Jersey, the largest U.S. city named Camden
 Port of Camden
 Camden (town), New York
 Camden (village), New York
 Camden, North Carolina
 Camden, Ohio, in Preble County
 Camden, South Carolina
 Battle of Camden, an engagement during the American Revolutionary War
 Camden (Amtrak station)
 Camden, Tennessee
 Camden, Texas
 Camden (Port Royal, Virginia), a historic house

Fictional 
 Camden House, in Arthur Conan Doyle's 1903 short story "The Adventure of the Empty House"
 The Camdens, a family in the TV drama 7th Heaven
 Camden County, in the TV series My Name Is Earl

U.S. Navy vessels 
 USS Camden (AS-6), a submarine tender, later a barracks ship
 USS Camden (AOE-2), combat support ship 1967-2005

Other uses
 Camden (album)

See also 
 Camden College (disambiguation)
 Camden County (disambiguation)
 Camden Football Club (disambiguation)
 Camden Francis, Philanthropist, Founder of Beyond the Crisis
 Camden Station, Baltimore, Maryland, U.S.
 Camden Township (disambiguation)
 Oriole Park at Camden Yards
 Camden House Publishing, founded in 1979
 Camden Property Trust
 Camden Society